Pear Lake is a lake located on Vancouver Island north of Elsie Lake, east of Nimnim Lake.

References

Alberni Valley
Lakes of Vancouver Island
Newcastle Land District